Mukwa may refer to:

Mukwa, Wisconsin, United States
Mukwa (tree), Pterocarpus, also referred to as mukwa.

See also 
 Mukua (disambiguation)

 Mukhwas, a South Asian snack